Hamid Rashid Maala (died 3 May 2021) was an Iraqi politician.

Biography
A member of the National Wisdom Movement, he served on the Council of Representatives of Iraq from 2005 to 2010.

References

2021 deaths
Iraqi politicians
Members of the Council of Representatives of Iraq
Deaths from the COVID-19 pandemic in Iraq